Søren Elung Jensen (7 July 1928 – 22 January 2017) was a Danish film actor. He appeared in 22 films between 1960 and 1999. He was born in Odense. He died from lung cancer on 22 January 2017 in Hellerup. He was 88.

Filmography

 Besat (1999)
 Manden som ikke ville dø (1999)
 Hvor er Ulla Katrine? (1974)
 Faderen (1974)
 TV-stykket (1974)
 Den levende vare (1972)
 Dukkens død (1972)
 Hotel Paradiso (1972)
 Kommunisten (1971)
 Hjemme hos William (1971)
 King Lear (1971)
 Mordskab (1969)
 Tænk på et tal (1969)
 Farvel Thomas (1968)
 Tine (1964)
 Støv for alle pengene (1963)
 Det støver stadig (1962)
 Den rige enke (1962)
 Flemming på kostskole (1961)
 Støv på hjernen (1961)
 Sorte Shara (1961)
 Kærlighed (1960)

References

External links

1928 births
2017 deaths
Danish male film actors
Danish male stage actors
Danish male television actors
Deaths from cancer in Denmark
People from Odense